August Voldemar Sternfeldt (10 December 1884, in Mäksa Parish, Tartu County – ?) was an Estonian politician. He was a member of Estonian Constituent Assembly. He was a member of the assembly since 29 May 1919. He replaced Johan Pitka.

References

1884 births
Members of the Estonian Constituent Assembly
Year of death missing